Peter William Borren (born 21 August 1983) is a former Dutch international cricketer. He was the captain for Netherlands at international level, until he retired in April 2018.

Early career
He played in the Under 19 World Cup in 2002 when he represented his native New Zealand alongside Ross Taylor and Jesse Ryder.

Domestic career
On 24 June 2015 he scored his debut List A century while playing against Papua New Guinea in the 2015–17 ICC World Cricket League Championship.

He also represented Central Districts in the Ford Trophy 50 over competition in his native New Zealand.

International career
He made his debut with the Netherlands national cricket team in a One Day International against Sri Lanka on 4 July 2006. He also previously played for the Netherlands A team and Under-23 team.

His career highlights are the two wins against England at the 2009 and 2014 T20 World Cups respectively.  He has won the Netherlands national competition with VRA Amsterdam 5 times in 12 years.

Peter Borren has the record for the worst career bowling strike rate in T20I history with 29.2 in his career.

Borren holds the joint record for taking the most catches in a single T20I as a fielder (4) along with Darren Sammy, Ajinkya Rahane, Babar Hayat, Corey Anderson and Dinesh Chandimal. He too has taken the most catches for Netherlands in a single T20I.

In November 2020, Borren was nominated for the ICC Men's Associate Cricketer of the Decade award.

References

External links

1983 births
Living people
New Zealand cricketers
Netherlands One Day International cricketers
Netherlands Twenty20 International cricketers
Central Districts cricketers
Cricketers from Christchurch
New Zealand expatriate sportspeople in the Netherlands
Cricketers at the 2007 Cricket World Cup
Cricketers at the 2011 Cricket World Cup
Dutch cricket captains
Dutch cricketers